Poseidon School was a private, coeducational secondary day school located in Los Angeles, California. It was certified by the California Department of Education but closed 2011.

Philosophy and Mission

The school specialized in "...meeting the needs of extremely gifted adolescents by providing an alternative program for students that need to be challenged."

Notable Faculty and Alumni
Jack Black - American actor, comedian, and musician
Debbie Devine, co-founder of 24th Street Theatre, was director of the Drama Program in 2006

References

External links
 

Educational institutions established in 1971
High schools in Los Angeles
Private high schools in California
1971 establishments in California
2011 disestablishments in California
Educational institutions disestablished in 2011